The Shrine of Imam Shadhili is a highly venerated place for Muslims, commemorating renowned Islamic scholar, imam and the founder of Shadhili Sufi order, Abu'l Hasan al-Shadhili, located in Humaithara, Egypt. It takes around 3 hours by road from Aswan, and 4–5 hours from Edfu.

Description
The core tomb building in which Imam Shadhili's grave is found was constructed in the year 1259 (656 Hijri), immediately after the death of Imam Shadhili. After the late 13th century, the number of pilgrims visiting the grave of Imam Shadhili increased and the shrine was extended in order to accommodate large numbers of people. The visitors to this shrine include Imam Fassi of Makkah, who is also called the second al-Shadhili and one of his important disciples, his 21st khalifah, and the founder of the Fassiya branch of the Shadhili order. Almost all leaders (shuyūkh) from Bait Al Fassi, Makkah have visited the shrine of Imam Shadhili, their shaykh here in Humaithara.

The well of Humaithara 
There is a well outside the shrine. Imam Shadhili's gargled water was poured into this well on the day before his death. The water in this well is located in the midst of a desert but never goes dry throughout the year. The water of this well is pure and it serves the drinking water needs of the local villages.

References

Buildings and structures completed in 1259
Buildings and structures in Egypt
Mausoleums in Egypt
13th-century establishments in the Mamluk Sultanate
Tourist attractions in Egypt